Naruse Dam is a trapezoidal dam located in Akita Prefecture in Japan. The dam is used for flood control, irrigation, water supply and power production. The catchment area of the dam is 68.1 km2. The dam impounds about 226  ha of land when full and can store 78500 thousand cubic meters of water. The construction of the dam was started on 1983. As of 2022, it is still under construction with completion planned for 20 March 2023.

References

Dams in Akita Prefecture